Sajoni Aamar Sohag (Bengali: সজনী আমার সোহাগ) is a 2000 Bengali film directed by Anup Sengupta.The film was produced by Rajkumar Kabra and Santu Sinha. It stars Prosenjit Chatterjee and Satabdi Roy. The film was a major commercial success banking on Chatterjee's stardom as well as his chemistry with Roy.

Plot

Cast
 Satabdi Roy as Rani Chowdhury
 Prosenjit Chatterjee as Bijoy
 Abhishek Chatterjee as Siddhartha
 Subhasish Mukhopadhyay as Manager
 Shakuntala Barua as Rani's mother
 Mona Dutta as Rinky, Bijoy and Rani's daughter
 Piya Sengupta as Anjali, Siddhartha's sister
 Monu Mukherjee as Servant
 Ramen Roy Chowdhury as Doctor

Music
This film has been music composed by Anupam Dutta.
Track listings :-
 01. Aaj Ker Eai Din - Kumar Sanu, Alka Yagnik
 02. Tumi Je Korle Churi - Kumar Sanu, Alka Yagnik 
 03. Boro Loker Beti Tumi - Abhijeet Bhattacharya
 04. Bhalobasa Dudiner Noy - Ravindra Jain

References

External links
 Sajoni Aamar Sohag at the Gomolo

2000 films
Bengali-language Indian films
2000s Bengali-language films
Films scored by Anupam Dutta
Films directed by Anup Sengupta